389th may refer to:

389th Bombardment Squadron, inactive United States Air Force unit
389th Fighter Squadron (389 FS) is part of the 366th Fighter Wing at Mountain Home Air Force Base, Idaho
389th Infantry Division (Wehrmacht), German division of the Wehrmacht in the Second World War; fought in the Battle of Stalingrad
389th Strategic Missile Wing, inactive unit of the United States Air Force

See also
389 (number)
389, the year 389 (CCCLXXXIX) of the Julian calendar
389 BC